Nate Shannon is a Democratic member of the Michigan House of Representatives.

Before being elected as a state representative, Shannon worked as a high school teacher, following in the footsteps of his public school teacher parents.

References

External links 
 Nate Shannon at housedems.com

Living people
Oakland University alumni
Wayne State University alumni
Democratic Party members of the Michigan House of Representatives
21st-century American politicians
Year of birth missing (living people)